Adderly Fong Cheun-yue (Traditional Chinese: 方駿宇; Pinyin: Fāng Jùnyǔ; born March 2, 1990) is a Canadian-Hong Kong racing driver. His career started in 2004. He is currently competing in the Blancpain GT World Challenge Asia racing series. He also completed the 2014 24 Hours of Le Mans with OAK Racing Team Asia, finishing 11th overall and 7th in the LMP2 class. In 2015, he was appointed as a test driver at Lotus F1 Team.

Early career
Fong finished 6th in the 2007 Formula V6 Asia season. His best result was 2nd place in Formula V6 Asia at Zhuhai in 2007.

2009 Toyota Racing Series (Formula Toyota New Zealand)
Fong drove car no. 50. in New Zealand's Toyota Racing Series and became the first Chinese driver to the series. He was supposed to race the three-round International Trophy that contested at tracks in Timaru International Motor Raceway, Invercargill's Teretonga Park and Taupo Motorsport Park. However, the result shows that he only finished his first two races in Timaru and Invercargill.

2010 British Formula 3 and Macau Grand Prix
Fong competed in the 2010 British Formula 3 for Sino Vision Racing and finished 16th overall. He then competed in the Macau Grand Prix. He could only qualify 30th and last. He finished 23rd in the qualifying race, then 21st in the main race.

2011 British Formula 3 and Macau Grand Prix
In 2011, Fong again competed in British Formula 3 and finished 22nd with 5 points. On 20 November 2011, he finished 10th in the 2011 Macau Grand Prix, despite damage to the right side of his car. He is the first Hong Kong driver to finish in the top 10 of the Macau F3 Grand Prix since Marchy Lee finished 7th in 2002.

2012 Audi R8 LMS Cup, British Formula 3 & Indy Lights
On 29 April, Fong took victory in round 2 of the Audi R8 LMS Cup at the Shanghai International Circuit in just his second ever sportscar race, also setting the fastest lap of the race, beating Alex Yoong and Marchy Lee. Fong scored his 2nd Audi R8 LMS Cup victory following a dramatic last-lap coming together between then-race leaders Marchy Lee and Alex Yoong at the Zhuhai International Circuit.

On 15 June, Fong announced he will split his Audi R8 LMS Cup programme to join forces with CF Racing for the Brands Hatch, Spa-Francorchamps and Snetterton rounds of the British F3 series, he will drive a National Class-spec Dallara. On 24 June, at round 14 of the British Formula 3 International Series at Brands Hatch, Fong completed a hat-trick of National class victories for the CF Racing team, leading the class throughout.

Fong also made one start in the Firestone Indy Lights series for Brooks Associates Racing on the Streets of Baltimore where he finished eighth.

2013 GP3 Series and Audi R8 LMS Cup
Fong will race in the 2013 GP3 Series with Status Grand Prix. On 10 November 2013, Fong won the Audi R8 LMS Cup series title in Macau.

Formula One
Fong tested with the Sauber Formula 1 team in 2014, completing 99 laps of the Valencia circuit in a 2012 Sauber C31. In 2015, Fong joined the Lotus Formula One team as a development driver.

Racing record

Superleague Formula
(key)

† Non-championship round

Complete Auto GP World Series results
(key) (Races in bold indicate pole position) (Races in italics indicate fastest lap)

Complete GP3 Series results
(key) (Races in bold indicate pole position) (Races in italics indicate fastest lap)

† Driver did not finish the race, but was classified as he completed over 90% of the race distance.

24 Hours of Le Mans results

Complete Formula One participations
(key) (Races in bold indicate pole position; races in italics indicates fastest lap)

References

External links
 

1990 births
Living people
A1 Grand Prix Rookie drivers
Asian Formula Renault Challenge drivers
Auto GP drivers
British Formula Three Championship drivers
Canadian emigrants to Hong Kong
Canadian people of Hong Kong descent
Racing drivers from British Columbia
Formula V6 Asia drivers
German Formula Three Championship drivers
Indy Lights drivers
24 Hours of Le Mans drivers
Sportspeople from Vancouver
Toyota Racing Series drivers
FIA Formula 3 European Championship drivers
GP3 Series drivers
Asian Le Mans Series drivers
24H Series drivers
Carlin racing drivers
A1 Grand Prix drivers
OAK Racing drivers
Jenzer Motorsport drivers
Koiranen GP drivers
Status Grand Prix drivers
Ombra Racing drivers
Audi Sport drivers
Phoenix Racing drivers